The United Farmers of Ontario entered politics by contesting a 1918 by-election which was won by UFO candidate Beniah Bowman. The next year, in the 1919 provincial election in Ontario they achieved a major political upset by winning enough seats to form a government in alliance with Labour MLAs in the Ontario legislature (also listed). The UFO did not have a leader until after the 1919 election when Ernest Charles Drury was asked by the caucus to serve as Premier of Ontario. As he did not have a seat in the legislature he had to enter via a by-election.

1874 by-election
Daniel John O'Donoghue, was the first Labour candidate elected to the Ontario legislature. He won an 1874 by-election in Ottawa. Though he supported the Liberals in the legislature he was defeated in the 1875 general election in a three way race against Conservative and Liberal opponents.

Patrons of Industry (1894)

Three candidates were elected under the Patrons of Industry banner in the 1894 general election:

 William Dynes, (Dufferin)
 James Haggerty, (Hastings North)
 David McNicol, (Grey South)

Twelve Liberals and one Conservative were also elected on a joint ticket with the Patrons. The party did not elect any candidates in the 1898 election.

Rise and fall of UFO and Labour
 = UFO
 = Progressive
 = Independent-Progressive
 = Labour
 = Labour-United Farmers
 = Liberal-United Farmers
 = Liberal-Progressive

United Farmer Labour MLAs